The Royal Geological Society of Cornwall is a geological society based in Penzance, Cornwall in the United Kingdom. It was founded in 1814 to promote the study of the geology of Cornwall, and is the second oldest geological society in the world, after the Geological Society of London which was founded in 1807.

History
The first President of the society was Davies Gilbert, the first Secretary John Ayrton Paris, and other notable members include Humphry Davy (some of whose papers are held by the Society), and William Gregor, who discovered titanium.

The society's first premises was a house in North Parade, Penzance and in 1853 the Borough of Penzance put forward plans for a new public building on the west side of Penzance. It was planned to have the Borough offices, county court and police station in the east wing, the two floors of the west wing housing the RGSC's museum and a public hall between the two run by a public company. The foundation stone was laid on 27 April 1864, the work was undertaken by Messr Olver & Sons of Falmouth and the complex was opened on 10 September 1867. The building, known as St John's Hall, still exists although, in July 2016, the west wing was occupied by the new Penzance library.

Notable people associated with the society
 Francis Arthur Bather (1863–1934), palaeontologist, geologist and malacologist.
 Henry Samuel Boase (1799–1883), geologist and author.
 Edward Budge (1800–1865), geologist and theologian.
 Elizabeth Catherine Thomas Carne (1817–1873), geologist and author.
 Joseph Carne (1782–1858), geologist.
 Joseph Henry Collins (1841–1916), mining engineer, mineralogist and geologist
 Richard Quiller Couch (1816–1863), naturalist and medical practitioner.
 Richard Edmonds (1801–1886), antiquary and geologist.
 John Forbes (1787–1861), physician to Queen Victoria.
 John Hawkins (1761–1841), traveller and geologist.
 John Mawe (1766–1829), mineralogist and dealer in minerals.
 Matthew Paul Moyle (1788–1856), surgeon and geologist.
 John Ayrton Paris (1785–1856), first secretary and research into the high rate of scrotal skin cancer among men working in copper-smelting in Cornwall and Wales.
 Charles William Peach (1800–1886), discovered fossils in Cornwall.
 John Rogers (1778–1856), Anglican clergyman and biblical scholar.

Bolitho Medal
The society awards the Bolitho Medal for notable achievement in geology. The first award was made to Robert Etheridge in 1896. It was awarded in 1948 to Sir Arthur Russell, 6th Baronet.

 1896 – Robert Etheridge
 1906 – Andrew Ketcham Barnett
 1948 – Sir Arthur Russell, 6th Baronet

Past presidents
 1814–1839 Davies Gilbert
 1840–1856 Sir Charles Lemon, FRS
 1857–1862 Augustus Smith 
 1863–1867 Charles Fox, FGS
 1868–1879 Hugh Seymour Tremenheere, CB
 1871–1879 Warington Smyth
 1880–1881 A Pendarves Vivian, FGS
 1881–1882 Leonard Courtney
 1883–1890 Warington Smyth
 1891–1892 John St Aubyn, 1st Baron St Levan
 1893–1894 Howard Fox
 1901–1902 Clement le Neve Foster
 1903–1904 Joseph Henry Collins
 1907–1908 Andrew Ketcham Barnett

References

External links

 Royal Geological Society of Cornwall website
 
 National Archives entry for the Royal Geological Society of Cornwall

1814 establishments in England
Clubs and societies in Cornwall
Cornish mining organisations
Geology of Cornwall
Geology societies
Organisations based in Cornwall
Penzance
Scientific organisations based in the United Kingdom
Scientific organizations established in 1814